Terje Rypdal Discography

As leader 
1968: Bleak House (Polydor/Universal, Norway 547 885–2)
1971: Terje Rypdal (ECM 1016)
1973: What Comes After (ECM 1031)
1974: Whenever I Seem to Be Far Away (ECM 1045)
1975: Odyssey (ECM 1067/8)
1976: After the Rain (ECM 1083)
1977: Waves (ECM 1110) 1977
1979: Terje Rypdal / Miroslav Vitous / Jack DeJohnette (ECM 1125), with Miroslav Vitous & Jack DeJohnette
1980: Descendre (ECM 1144)
1981: To Be Continued (ECM 1192), with Miroslav Vitous & Jack DeJohnette
1984: Eos (ECM 1263), with David Darling
1985: Chaser (ECM 1303), with The Chasers
1987: Blue (ECM 1346), with The Chasers
1989: The Singles Collection (ECM 1383), with The Chasers
1990: Undisonus (ECM 1389)
1991: Q.E.D. (ECM 1474)
1995: If Mountains Could Sing (ECM 1554)
1997: Skywards (ECM 1608)
1997: Rypdal & Tekrø (RCA 74321 242962), with Ronni Le Tekrø
1997: Rypdal/Tekrø II, with Ronni Le Tekrø
2000: Double Concerto / 5th Symphony (ECM 1567)
2002: Lux Aeterna (ECM 1818)
2002: The Radiosong (BeatHeaven Records BH 006) with Ronni Le Tekrø
2002: Birgitte Stærnes Sonata Op.73 / Nimbus Op.76 (MTG Music MTG CD 70085)
2002: Selected Recordings (Volume VII of ECM's :rarum series) (rarum 8007)
2006: Vossabrygg (ECM 1984), commissioned work at Vossajazz 2003
2010: Crime Scene (ECM 2014), live recording
2012: Odyssey In Studio & In Concert (ECM 2136–38) 3xCD album
2013: Melodic Warrior (ECM 2006) with The Hilliard Ensemble
2020: Conspiracy (ECM 2658)

As sideman 
Within The Vanguards
1965: Hjemme Igjen
1966: Phnooole
1980: Norsk Rock's Gyldne År (Sonet SLP 1458)
1986: Comanchero (Polydor 831 208–1)
1990: Twang!!! (DLP 33043/Triola TRCD 06)
2003: Vanguards Special (Tylden & Co. GTACD8191/2), The Vanguards 1963-2003 collection

With Lester Bowie
1969: Gittin' to Know Y'All (MPS/BASF)

With Jan Garbarek
1969: Esoteric Circle (Freedom FCD 41031)
1970: Afric Pepperbird (ECM 1007)
1971: Sart (ECM 1015)

With George Russell
1969: Electronic Sonata for Souls Loved by Nature
1970: Trip to Prillarguri (Soul Note 121029–2)
1971: Listen to the Silence (Soul Note 121024–2)
1971: The Essence of George Russell (Sonet)

With Jan Erik Vold
1969: Briskeby Blues (Philips 834 711–2)
1971: Hav (Philips 6507 002)

With John Surman
1973: Morning Glory (Future Music FMRCD-13 L495)
1994: Nordic Quartet (ECM)
With Michael Mantler
1976: The Hapless Child (WATT/ECM)
With Edward Vesala
1977: Satu (ECM)

with Barre Phillips
1978: Three Day Moon (ECM)

With Ketil Bjørnstad
1993: Water Stories (ECM)
1995: The Sea (ECM)
1998: The Sea II (ECM)
2008: Life in Leipzig (ECM)

With Tomasz Stańko
1997: Litania: Music of Krzysztof Komeda (ECM)

With Michael Galasso
2005: High Lines (ECM)

With Paolo Vinaccia
2010: Very Much Alive (Jazzland), 6xCD album

With Others
1967: Get Dreamy (Polydor 842 972–2), within The Dream (including Hans Marius Stormoen, Tom Karlsen, Christian Reim)
1970: Min Bul (Polydor 2382003), within Min Bul
1971: Actions (Wergo SM 1010; Philips 6305153; on CD as Transparency TRANS00081971), with Krzystof Penderecki, Don Cherry & The New Eternal Rhythm Orchestra live in Donaueschingen
1971: New Violin Summit (MPS 3321285-8/MPS 88025-2/MPS2222720-0 - released on CD as Euro Series 468036 504), with Jean-Luc Ponty, Don "Sugarcane" Harris, Michał Urbaniak, Nipso Brantner, Wolfgang Dauner, Neville Whitehead, Robert Wyatt) 1971
1971: Popofoni (Sonet SLP 1421,2), with Karin Krog, Jan Garbarek, et al.
1973: Real Rock 'N' Roll (Philips 6317013), with Per "Elvis" Granberg and The New Jordal Swingers
1975: New Jazz Festival - Hamburg 1975, with various artists
1976: The Hapless Child (Watt/4), with Michael Mantler and Edward Gorey
1976: No Time for Time (Zarepta ZA 34005/Sonet SLP1437), with Pål Thowsen & Jon Christensen
1976: Samse Tak! (Egil "Bop" Johansen) (Four Leaf FLC 5013) 1976
1976: Dream (Karusell 2915 066), within The Dream (including Hans Marius Stormoen, Tom Karlsen & Christian Reim)
1977: Bruksdikt for Deg og Meg (Polydor 2920 172), with Carl Frederik Prytz
1978: Three Day Moon (ECM 1123), with Barre Phillips
1980: Apecalypso Nå (Polydor 2382 112), with Lars Mjøen and Knut Lystad
1985: Bratislava Jazz Days 1985 (Opus Czechoslovakia 9115 1810-11, two-LP set)
1987: Nice Guys (Norwegian label?), with Hungry John and The Blue Shadows
1988: Natt Jazz 20 År (Grappa Music GRCD 103), with various artists
1990: Contemporary Music for Big Band (SSCD 002), with Sandvika Storband
1990: Vegmerker (Pro Musica PP9022), with Trondhjems Studentersangforening
1991: Mnaomai, Mnomai (ECM 1378), with Heinz Reber
1993: Unplugged: Mozart and Rypdal (MTG-CD 21111), with Hans Petter Bonden
1994: Deep Harmony, with Tomra Brass Band
1995: Come Together: Guitar Tribute To The Beatles, Vol. 2, with various artists
1997: Bitt (Polygram 5365832), with Audun Kleive
1997: Meridians (ACT 9263-2), with Torbjørn Sunde
1997: Road Song (Villa Records AS VRCD 005), with Knut Mikalsen's Bopalong Quintet
1999: Dawn of a New Century (Mercury Records 538 838–2), with Secret Garden
1999: Snøfreser'n/FBI (Spinner Records GTIS 704 - CD single), with Øystein Sunde
2000: Kartā (ECM 1704), with Markus Stockhausen, with Arild Andersen & Patrice Héral
2000: Song....Tread Lightly (Sony Denmark CK 91439), with Palle Mikkelborg
2000: Navigations (Simax Classics PSC 1212), with Kyberia
2000: Open The Door Softly (ExLibris EXLCD 30079), with Helen Davis
2002: Sonata / Nimbus (MTG Record Company; A Corda),with Birgitte Stærnes
2002: Magica Lanterna, with Ronni Le Tekrø
2003: Kahlil Gibran's "The Prophet"

References 

Discographies of Norwegian artists